Partners in Crime is a 1937 American crime film directed by Ralph Murphy and written by Gladys Unger and Garnett Weston. The film stars Lynne Overman, Roscoe Karns, Muriel Hutchison, Anthony Quinn, Inez Courtney and Lucien Littlefield. The film was released on October 8, 1937, by Paramount Pictures.

Karns and Overman repeated their private-eye characters from Murder Goes to College, released earlier that year.

Plot

Cast 
Lynne Overman as Hank Hyer
Roscoe Karns as Sim Perkins
Muriel Hutchison as Odette Le Vin
Anthony Quinn as Nicholas Mazaney
Inez Courtney as Lillian Tate
Lucien Littlefield as Mr. Twitchell
Charles Halton as Silas Wagon
Charles C. Wilson as Inspector Simpson
June Brewster as Mabel
Esther Howard as Mrs. Wagon
Nora Cecil as Housekeeper
Russell Hicks as Mayor Callahan
Don Brodie as Reporter
Archie Twitchell as Photographer

References

External links 
 

1937 films
Paramount Pictures films
American crime films
1937 crime films
Films directed by Ralph Murphy
American black-and-white films
1930s English-language films
1930s American films